Multiple PDZ domain protein is a protein that in humans is encoded by the MPDZ gene.

Interactions 

MPDZ has been shown to interact with:
 5-HT2C receptor,
 CD117,  and
 PLEKHA1.

References

Further reading